Aastiparulu is a 1966 Indian Telugu-language drama film, produced by V. B. Rajendra Prasad and directed by V. Madhusudhana Rao. It stars Akkineni Nageswara Rao and Jayalalithaa, with music composed by K. V. Mahadevan. The film was remade in Tamil as En Thambi  and in Hindi as Bhai Ho To Aisa. The storyline was also an inspiration for the 2008 Telugu film King (2008).

Plot 
Zamindar Janardhan Rao a paterfamilias, holds high esteem in society. He lives along with his wife Kaasulamma, two sons Krishna, Bhaskar/ Bachi and an infant daughter Ammulu. The elder one Krishna is altruistic, amiable and devoted to his family, whereas younger Bachi is a vagabond and malicious. As Krishna is the step-son Kasulamma, Bachi always shows resentment. Krishna falls for her maternal aunt Rajyalakshmi's daughter Radha. Meanwhile, Bachi's misdeeds increase day by day, Janardhan Rao cuts his allowance, so, one night he tries to make a theft when his father obstructs his way and collapses with a heart attack. Before dying, he entrusts the entire authority on the property to Krishna and secretly reveals regarding a hidden treasure of their family hierarchy. Here, homicidal Bachi plots and intrigues against Krishna to drown him in the river and show it as an accident. Knowing it, Ammulu becomes terminally ill due to angst on Krishna. Meanwhile, Rajayalakshmi decides to hand over the property to Bachi and also to couple up Radha with him, but her son Prasad wants to prevent the injustice. At that juncture, fortuitously, he spots a person Seenu, a drama artist, who resembles Krishna, Prasad seeks his help, trains him well and he infiltrates as Krishna. But Bachi is not ready to accept it, so, he makes various attempts to falsify Seenu but breaks down. At present, Rajyalakshmi begins wedding arrangements of Krishna and Radha when perturbed Prasad divulges the reality. Thereupon, as a flabbergast, Seenu affirms himself as Krishna who has escaped from death and entered in disguise to reform his brother which no one believes and he is thrown out. During that plight, Krishna remembers regarding the hidden treasure through which he bring out the veracity. Bachi follows and again tries to slaughter him. In the combat, Krishna rescues Baachi against harm. At last, Baachi repents and pleads pardon from Krishna. Krishna marries Radha.

Cast

Soundtrack 

Music composed by K. V. Mahadevan. The song "Soggade Chinni Nayana" was used as the title of a 2016 film.

Accolades 
 Filmfare Award for Best Film – Telugu – V. B. Rajendra Prasad (1966)
 Nandi Award for Third Best Feature Film - Bronze (1966)

References

External links 
 

1960s Telugu-language films
1966 films
Films directed by V. Madhusudhana Rao
Films scored by K. V. Mahadevan
Telugu films remade in other languages